"Don't Break My Heart" is the debut single by British AOR band Romeo's Daughter, released in 1988. It is from the band's self-titled debut album. The song charted on the Billboard Hot 100 for seven weeks, peaking at No. 73 on the week of 12 November 1988, becoming their only American hit.

Charts

References

Romeo's Daughter songs
1988 debut singles
Song recordings produced by Robert John "Mutt" Lange
Songs written by Robert John "Mutt" Lange
1988 songs
Jive Records singles